Alopoglossus kugleri, Kugler's largescale lizard, is a species of lizard in the family Alopoglossidae. It is endemic to Venezuela.

References

Alopoglossus
Reptiles of Venezuela
Endemic fauna of Venezuela
Reptiles described in 1927
Taxa named by Jean Roux
Taxobox binomials not recognized by IUCN